Sven Holmberg (9 February 1918 – 1 April 2003) was a Swedish actor. He appeared in more than 60 films and television shows between 1949 and 1988.

Selected filmography
 Love Wins Out (1949)
 Knockout at the Breakfast Club (1950)
 My Name Is Puck (1951)
 Classmates (1952)
 Speed Fever (1953)
 The Shadow (1953)
 Unmarried Mothers (1953)
 The Chieftain of Göinge (1953)
 A Night in the Archipelago (1953)
Taxi 13 (1954)
 Far och flyg (1955)
 Darling of Mine (1955)
 Whoops! (1955)
 Voyage in the Night (1955)
 Uncle's (1955)
 The Biscuit (1956)
 Night Child (1956)
 Woman in a Fur Coat (1958)
 Åsa-Nisse in Military Uniform (1958)
 Miss April (1958)
 A Lion in Town (1959)
 Sten Stensson Returns (1963)
 Sailors (1964)
 Emil and the Piglet (1973)

References

External links

1918 births
2003 deaths
20th-century Swedish male actors
Swedish male film actors
Swedish male television actors
People from Norrköping